Loricaria is a genus of South American flowering plants in the tribe Gnaphalieae within the family Asteraceae.

 Species

References

 
Asteraceae genera
Flora of South America